Wittmackia turbinocalyx is a species of flowering plant in the family Bromeliaceae, endemic to Brazil (the states of Bahia and Minas Gerais). It was first described in 1892 by Carl Christian Mez as Aechmea turbinocalyx.

References

Bromelioideae
Endemic flora of Brazil
Plants described in 1892